Karlovice is a municipality and village in Bruntál District in the Moravian-Silesian Region of the Czech Republic. It has about 1,000 inhabitants.

Administrative parts
The village of Zadní Ves is an administrative part of Karlovice.

Geography
Karlovice is located on the tripoint of three mountain ranges: Zlatohorská Highlands, Nízký Jeseník and Hrubý Jeseník. Most of the municipal territory lies in the Zlatohorská Highlands. The built-up area lies in the valley of the Opava River.

History
The first written mention of Karlovice is from 1558, then called Hütten. The village was destroyed during the Thirty Years' War and renewed in the 18th century.

During the World War II, the German occupiers operated the E733 forced labour subcamp of the Stalag VIII-B/344 prisoner-of-war camp in the village.

Sights
The Church of Saint John of Nepomuk was built in the late Baroque style in 1777–1779.

A protected technical monument is a former scythe manufactory. It is a timbered two-storey house dating from about 1600, modified to its present form in 1759. Today it houses a local museum that focuses primarily on forestry.

Gallery

References

External links

Villages in Bruntál District